Deuce is the second video album by American nu metal band Korn. The DVD was released on 11 June 2002, on the same day as the band's fifth studio album, Untouchables. It was certified platinum by the RIAA in July 2002. Deuce includes the band's biographical video, Who Then Now?, as well as music videos from albums Korn up to Issues. Other extras include biographies of each band member, gags, behind-the-scenes and live concerts.

Track listing
"Blind"
"Shoots And Ladders"
"Clown"
"Faget"
"A.D.I.D.A.S."
"Got the Life"
"Freak on a Leash"
"Falling Away from Me"
"Make Me Bad"
"Somebody Someone"

See also
Korn video albums

References

Korn video albums
2002 compilation albums
Music video compilation albums
2002 video albums